Flower's shrew (Crocidura floweri) is a species of mammal in the family Soricidae. It is endemic to Egypt.  Its natural habitat is arable land.

Sources

Flower's shrew
Mammals of the Middle East
Endemic fauna of Egypt
Flower's shrew
Taxonomy articles created by Polbot